Noah's Arc is an American cable television comedy-drama created, written and directed by Patrik-Ian Polk. The series, which predominantly features gay black and Latino characters and revolves around the lives of four black gay friends living in Los Angeles, California.

Series overview

<onlyinclude>

Episodes

Season 1 (2005)

Season 2 (2006)

References

External links
 

Noah's Arc